Shivrajpur is a town and a nagar panchayat in Kanpur Nagar district in the Indian state of Uttar Pradesh.It comes under Kanpur Metropolitan Area. Tecson India Solution

At Shivrajpur, there is an ancient temple built by Raja Sati Prasad in memory of his queen. This temple was built in a day and is situated on the banks of river Ganges. This temple is famous for its beautiful architectural work and its unique carving design. One inter college and one degree college are also situated in Shivrajpur near GT road. The described historical temple is very famous all over Kanpur and its name is Khereshwar temple. Near to this temple one temple of Mahakaal is also very famous.

Demographics
 India census, Shivrajpur had a population of 11,948. Males constitute 53% of the population and females 47%. Shivrajpur has an average literacy rate of 62%, higher than the national average of 59.5%: male literacy is 69%, and female literacy is 55%. In Shivrajpur, 16% of the population is under 6 years of age.

Tourist attractions

Khereshwar Temple (35km From Kanpur) Mythology states that Ashwathama still visits this temple in search of Moksha by worshipping Lord Shiva.

Mahakaal Shiv Temple
Ganga River
Ganga Bridge
Bhuteshwar Temple

Transport

This town is connected via National Highway with railway station Kanpur to Farrukhabad North Central Railway line where fast and super fast train are available to Mathura, Agra, Delhi, Meerut, Bilhaur.This town is directly connected by National Highway NH 91 to Kanpur city.

Also, Shivrajpur has direct highway to Lucknow through new Ganga Bridge.

References

commons.wikimedia.org

Cities and towns in Kanpur Nagar district